Cash for access refers to scandals involving the clandestine receipt of money for delivering meetings with senior office-holders. Examples include:

 Derek Draper, 1998 Cash for Access scandal, also known as 'Lobbygate'
 Sarah, Duchess of York, 2010 Cash for Access scandal
2012 cash for access scandal:
 Peter Cruddas, 2012 Cash for Access scandal
 Sarah Southern, 2012 Cash for Access scandal
2015 cash for access scandal:
Malcolm Rifkind
Jack Straw

See also
 Cash-for-questions affair, UK, 1990s
 Cash for Honours
 Cash for Influence (disambiguation)

Political funding in the United Kingdom
Political scandals in the United Kingdom